The following list includes settlements, geographic features, and political subdivisions of West Virginia whose names are derived from Native American languages.

Listings

Counties

 Kanawha County
 Village of Kanawha
 Kanawha City
 Village of Kanawha Falls
 Village of Kanawha Head
 Kanawha Falls (Waterfall)
 Kanawha River
 Little Kanawha River
 West Fork Little Kanawha River
 Right Fork Little Kanawha River
 Kanawha State Forest
 Mingo County
 Village of Mingo
 Village of Upper Mingo
 Mingo Run (Brooke County)
 Mingo Run (Randolph County)
 Monongalia County
 Ohio County
 Ohio River
 Pocahontas County
 Wyoming County
 Village of Wyoming
 Wyoming City

Settlements

 Alaska – named after the state of Alaska.
 Algoma
 Alpoca
 Apgah
 Aracoma
 Arkansas – named after the state of Arkansas.
 Bolivar – named after Simon Bolivar.
 Great Cacapon
 Forks of Cacapon
 Village of Little Cacapon
 Cacapon Mountain
 Little Cacapon Mountain
 Cacapon River
 Little Cacapon River
 Capon Bridge
 Village of Capon Lake
 Village of Capon Springs
 Village of Capon Springs Station
 Capon Lake Whipple Truss Bridge
 Capon Springs Resort
 Capon Springs Run
 Capon Chapel
 Captina
 Catawba
 Chattaroy
 Cherokee – named after the Cherokee people.
 Cheyenne Valley – named after the Cheyenne people.
 Cisco
 Cuba – named after the country of Cuba.
 Cubana
 Decota
 Etowah
 Havaco
 Havana – named after the eponymous Cuban capital.
 Hiawatha – named after the eponymous Iroquois chief.
 Hoohoo
 Iroquois – named after the Iroquois people.
 Iuka
 Kalamazoo – named after the eponymous Michigan city.
 Kentuck
 Klondike
 Lacoma
 Lake Shawnee – named after the Shawnee people.
 Shawnee Run
 Lico
 Matoaka
 Merrimac
 Miami – named after the Miami people.
 Michigan – named after the state of Michigan.
 Minnehaha Springs – named after the eponymous character in Dakota folklore.
 Missouri Branch – named after the Missouri river.
 Modoc – named after the Modoc people.
 Mohawk – named after the Mohawk people.
 Mohegan – named after the Mohegan people.
 Naugatuck
 Neponset
 Okonoko
 Onego
 Opekiska
 Opekiska Lock and Dam
 Osage – named after the Osage people.
 Osceola
 Otsego
 Ottawa – named after the Odawa people.
 Ovapa
 Peora – named after the Peoria people.
 Peru – named after the country of Peru.
 Pickaway
 Pocatalico
 Pocatalico River
 Potomac
 Potomac River
 North Branch Potomac River
 South Branch Potomac River
 Powhatan – named after the Powhatan people.
 Roanoke – named after the eponymous Virginia settlement.
 Seminole (Harrison County) – named after the Seminole people.
 Seminole (Summers County)
 Seneca Rocks
 Seneca Creek
 Seneca Rocks
 Seneca State Forest
 Shegon
 Shenandoah Junction
 Shenandoah River
 Shenandoah Mountain
 Shenango
 Shenango Creek
 South Buckhannon
 Tappan
 Texas – named after the state of Texas.
 Tioga
 Tomahawk – named after the eponymous Native American weapon.
 Tuckahoe
 Viropa
 Wahoo
 Waneta
 Wappocomo
 Watoga – from the Cherokee word for "starry waters."
 Watoga State Park
 Weyanoke
 Winona (Taylor County)
 Winona (Fayette County)
 Wyco
 Wyoma
 Yukon – named after the eponymous Alaska river.

Bodies of water

 Bingamon Creek
 Buckhannon River
 Left Fork Buckhannon River
 Right Fork Buckhannon River
 Canoe Run
 Elakala Falls
 Guyandotte River – named after the Wyandotte people.
 Hogtan Run
 Monongahela River
 Monongahela National Forest
 Pocosin Fork
 Swago Creek – shortening of "Oswego".
 Tilhance Creek
 Tuscarora Creek
 Opequon Creek
 Youghiogheny River

Other

 Allegheny Mountains
 Allegheny Front
 Allegheny Mountain
 Back Allegheny Mountain
 High Allegheny National Park and Preserve
 Appalachian Mountains
 Ridge-and-Valley Appalachians
 Appalachian Forest National Heritage Area
 Cabwaylingo State Forest
 Coon Bone Island
 Kumbrabow State Forest
 Muskingum Island
 Pinnickinnick Mountain

See also
List of place names in the United States of Native American origin

References

Citations

Sources

 Bright, William (2004). Native American Placenames of the United States. Norman: University of Oklahoma Press. .

 
 
Place names